Niraula, sometimes also referred as "Niroula") is a Nepali surname. "Niraula" is a surname of both Brahmin's and Kshetri's in Nepal and some parts of India. They are the descendants of Bharadvaja whose gotra is Bharadwaaj Gotra (भारद्वाज ऋषि).

Residence of Niraulas  
People with the Surname "Niraula" are living in majority of Districts in Nepal including Jhapa, Okhaldhunga, Salyan, Morang, Kathmandu and others. In India, they live in Places such as Upper Sikkim and Darjeeling.

Notable people 
 Deepa Shree Niraula (born 1975), Nepali actress
 Mohan Niraula ( Actor/Director)
 Lekhnath Niraula ( Actor/Director)
 Hari Niraula Kakroch ( Actor/Director)
 Pabitra Niraula Kharel, Nepali politician

References

Surnames of Nepalese origin
Nepali-language surnames
Khas surnames